Cathal Malone (born 1992) is an Irish hurler who plays for Clare Senior Championship club Sixmilebridge and at inter-county level with the Clare senior hurling team. He usually lines out at midfield.

Honours

Sixmilebridge
Clare Senior Hurling Championship (3): [ Clare Senior Hurling Championship]], 2015, 2017

Clare
National Hurling League (1): 2016
All-Ireland Under-21 Hurling Championship (2):20122013
Munster Under-21 Hurling Championship (2):2012 2013
Munster Minor Hurling Championship (1): 2010

References

1992 births
Living people
Sixmilebridge hurlers
Clare inter-county hurlers